Corythoichthys intestinalis, known commonly as the scribbled pipefish, is a species of marine fish in the family Syngnathidae. Other common names used include banded pipefish, Australian banded pipefish, Australian messmate pipefish and messmate pipefish.

The Scribbled pipefish is widespread throughout the tropical waters of the central Indo-Pacific region.

The Scribbled pipefish is a small fish and can reach a maximum size of  total length.

Biology
The Scribbled pipefish is  ovoviviparous. The male carries the eggs in a brood pouch which is found under the tail.

References

External links
 http://www.marinespecies.org/aphia.php?p=taxdetails&id=217995
 

Corythoichthys
Ovoviviparous fish
Fish described in 1881